The Sanjak of Vidin or the Vidin Sanjak was a sanjak in the Ottoman Empire, with Vidin as its administrative centre. It was established after the Battle of Nicopolis in 1396 out of the territories of the Tsardom of Vidin and in the mid-15th century annexed some territories that belonged to the Serbian Despotate before the Ottomans captured it.

Background 

After the major breakthrough into the Balkans at the end of the 14th century, the Ottomans were well aware of the strategic importance of Danube and decided to capture all important fortresses on its banks. The Tsardom of Vidin, which was under control of Ivan Sratsimir, became an Ottoman vassal state in 1393, and a strong Ottoman garrison was stationed in Vidin. Before the Battle of Nicopolis in 1396, Sratsimir surrendered the Ottoman garrison to the crusaders who were soon defeated, while Sratsimir was captured by the Ottomans and killed in 1397.

According to the Ottoman tax registers  from 1454-55 the territory of the Sanjak included the following nahiyahs: Banya (Sokobanja), Belgrad (present-day Belogradchik), Veleshnitsa, Vidin, Gelvie (Glavje), Zagorie, Isvrlig (Svrljig), Kladobo (Kladovo), Krivina, Timok, Tcherna reka/Crna reka and the following fortresses: Vidin, Banya (Sokobanja), Belgrad (present-day Belogradchik),  Isvrlig (Svrljig) and Florentin. 

Some scholars consider that the regions of Negotin, Kljuc and partly Tcherna reka/Crna reka belonged prior to the Ottoman conquest to Serbian Despotate and were included in the Sanjak of Vidin after 1455, because the first census of the Sanjak of Vidin does not mention them. It is assumed (by historian Bojanić-Lukač and other historians who confirm her opinion) that after the final Ottoman conquest, it was necessary to populate this depopulated territory before its inclusion in the timar system of the Sanjak of Vidin. Until then it was a separate administrative unit, one of many Ottoman borderlands.

History 

Some people from the neighbouring Romanian territory began migrating to the Sanjak of Vidin, especially after the Long War (1591–1606) and the hunger crisis which struck after the war.

In 1807, during the First Serbian Uprising, Serbian rebels attacked parts of the sanjak, which at the time was still under the control of Ottoman renegade Osman Pazvantoglu. The rebels' aim was to establish communication with the Russian troops in Wallachia under General Ignatiev. After the collapse of the First Serbian Uprising, part of the territory around Sokobanja and Svrljig recaptured from the rebels was annexed by the Sanjak of Vidin.

The Sanjak of Vidin was one of six Ottoman sanjaks with the most developed shipbuilding (alongside the sanjaks of Smederevo, Nicopolis, Požega, Zvornik and Mohač).

Administration 

In 1396, Vidin was finally and permanently captured by the Ottomans, who improved its Baba Vida fortress and built long walls around it.

In 1455, Ottomans registered all populated places in the sanjak for the first time. Four defters were made in the Sanjak of Vidin in the period between 1483 and 1586. In 1460, after his success in the battle near Baziaş (and the capture of Michael Szilágyi) the sultan rewarded Ali Bey Mihaloğlu by appointing him as sanjakbey of Vidin. In March 1834 Husseyn pasha was appointed as sanjakbey of the Sanjak of Nicopolis and Sanjak of Vidin.

After 1541, the sanjak became part of the Budin Eyalet. From 1846 to 1864, the sanjak belonged to the Widdin Eyalet, while from 1864 to 1878, it was part of the Danube Vilayet.

References

Further reading

External links 
 Видинският санджак през 15 век on www.vidin-online.com

Sanjaks of the Ottoman Empire in Europe
Ottoman period in the history of Bulgaria
Ottoman Serbia
Sanjak of Vidin
1396 establishments in the Ottoman Empire
1878 disestablishments in the Ottoman Empire
States and territories disestablished in 1878
States and territories established in 1396